The Rec.Sport.Soccer Statistics Foundation (RSSSF) is an international organization dedicated to collecting statistics about association football. The foundation aims to build an exhaustive archive of football-related information from around the world.

History
This enterprise, according to its founders, was created in January 1994 by three regulars of the  Rec.Sport.Soccer (RSS) Usenet newsgroup: Lars Aarhus, Kent Hedlundh, and Karel Stokkermans. It was originally known as the "North European Rec.Sport.Soccer Statistics Foundation", but the geographical reference was dropped as its membership from other regions grew.

The RSSSF has members and contributors from all around the world and has spawned seven spin-off projects to more closely follow the leagues of that project's home country. The spin-off projects are dedicated to Albania, Brazil, Denmark, Norway, Poland (90minut.pl), Romania, Uruguay, Venezuela, and Egypt.

Reception 
RSSSF's database has been described as the "very best" for football data.

Rec.Sport.Soccer Player of the Year 
Since 1992 a vote for the Best Footballer in the World among the readers of the rec.sport.soccer newsgroup. It was held yearly until 2005, when it was discontinued. The voting works as follows: each voter chooses five players, at most two of the same nationality, in order; these obtain five to one points. The nationality restriction was dropped for the 2003 vote, in which voting was restricted to 173 pre-selected players.

Wins by player

Wins by country

Wins by club

References

Bibliography
  Archived 23 January 2014

External links
 Rec.Sport.Soccer Statistics Foundation
 RSSSF charter

Association football websites
Usenet
Organizations established in 1994